James Clements, better known as ASC, is a British electronic music producer who currently resides in Del Mar, California. He has been releasing music under the alias ASC since 1999, and originally gained popularity as a drum and bass producer. Since the late 2000s, he has been one of the key artists in the emerging autonomic genre, along with artists such as dBridge and Instra:Mental.

He is married to dubstep producer, Vaccine.

Discography

Albums
 Environments (2003)
 Open Spaces (2004)
 Remixes & Collaborations (2006)
 Heights of Perception (2009)
 The Astral Traveler (2009)
 Nothing Is Certain (2010)
 The Light That Burns Twice as Bright (2011)
 Decayed Society (2012)	
 Out of Sync (2012)
 Time Heals All (2013)
 Truth Be Told (2014)
 Fervent Dream (2015)
 Imagine the Future (2015)
 No Stars Without Darkness (2016)
 Trans-Neptunian Objects (2017)
 Astral Projection (2018)
 Trans-Neptunian Objects II (2018)
 The Waves (2019)
 Rainfall (2019)
 1138 (2019)
 Realm of the Infinite (2019)

References

Living people
English drum and bass musicians
English electronic musicians
English record producers
Year of birth missing (living people)